Taymara Oropesa Pupo (born 6 December 1995) is a Cuban badminton player.

Career 
Oropeza started playing badminton at aged 14. She actually playing tennis since she was eight. She made the change because her mother asked her to find another sport where she was less exposed to the sun. In 2014, she competed at the Central American and Caribbean Games and she won gold in the mixed doubles event and two bronze medals in the women's doubles and mixed team events. In 2015, she participated at the Pan American Games in Toronto, Canada. She won the mixed doubles event at the Giraldilla International tournament in 2014 and 2017 with different partner.

Achievements

Central American and Caribbean Games 
Women's singles

Women's doubles

Mixed doubles

BWF International Challenge/Series 
Women's singles

Women's doubles

Mixed doubles

  BWF International Challenge tournament
  BWF International Series tournament
  BWF Future Series tournament

References

External links 

 

1995 births
Living people
People from Holguín
Cuban female badminton players
Pan American Games competitors for Cuba
Badminton players at the 2015 Pan American Games
Badminton players at the 2019 Pan American Games
Central American and Caribbean Games gold medalists for Cuba
Central American and Caribbean Games silver medalists for Cuba
Central American and Caribbean Games bronze medalists for Cuba
Competitors at the 2014 Central American and Caribbean Games
Competitors at the 2018 Central American and Caribbean Games
Central American and Caribbean Games medalists in badminton
20th-century Cuban women
21st-century Cuban women